Sameera Reddy (born 14 December 1978) is a former Indian actress who primarily worked in Hindi films, in addition to Tamil and Telugu language films. Reddy made her film debut with the 2002 film Maine Dil Tujhko Diya. She is best known for starring in films such as Darna Mana Hai (2003), Musafir (2004), Jai Chiranjeeva (2005), Taxi Number 9211 (2006), Ashok (2006), Race (2008), Varanam Aayiram (2008), De Dana Dan (2009), Aakrosh (2010), Vettai (2012) and Tezz (2012).

Early life
Sameera Reddy was born in Bombay (now Mumbai), Maharashtra to a Telugu father and a Mangalorean mother. Her mother Nakshatra, referred to as Niki by her daughters and the media, was a microbiologist and worked with an NGO. She has two siblings, Meghna Reddy, a former VJ and supermodel, and Sushama Reddy, a Bollywood actress and model, both elder to her. She did her schooling at Bombay Scottish School in Mahim, Mumbai and graduated from Sydenham College.

Reddy described herself as a "tomboy" and "the ugly duckling in the family", while citing: "I was plump, had glasses and my glam quotient was rather low till I was 19."

Career

Reddy first appeared in ghazal singer Pankaj Udhas's "Aur Aahista" music video in 1997. She was meant to make her debut as an actress in Saravana Subbiah's Tamil film Citizen, during early 2000s, but eventually did not feature. She caught the attention of Bollywood and was cast in a pivotal role in the 2002 Hindi film Maine Dil Tujhko Diya. In 2004, she appeared in Musafir, opposite Anil Kapoor, Aditya Pancholi and Koena Mitra.

Reddy had a huge fan base in south India after her debut in Varanam Aayiram.

Reddy is also the first Indian actress to have her own video game, Sameera the Street Fighter. 

Reddy was a judge for the Miss Sri Lanka Online contest in 2012.

Personal life 
Reddy married Akshai Varde, an entrepreneur, on 21 January 2014, in a traditional Maharashtrian ceremony. They have a son and daughter.

Being a fan of American talk show hostess Oprah Winfrey, Reddy met and presented a saree to Winfrey during her visit to India.

Filmography

Films

Music videos

Video games

See also

 List of Hindi film actresses

References

External links

 
 
 

Living people
1978 births
Actresses from Mumbai
Indian film actresses
Telugu actresses
Actresses in Hindi cinema
Actresses in Telugu cinema
Actresses in Tamil cinema
Actresses in Malayalam cinema
Actresses in Kannada cinema
Actresses in Bengali cinema
Indian expatriate actresses in the United Kingdom
21st-century Indian actresses